Carl Frank Kletzenbauer (21 July 1936 – 8 August 1996) was an English footballer who made 134 appearances in the Football League playing for Coventry City and Walsall. He was a member of the Coventry team that beat West Ham United in the final to win the last edition of the Southern Professional Floodlit Cup in 1960, and played nine matches in the 1963–64 season as Coventry went on to win the Football League Third Division title. He was sold to Walsall before the end of that season.

References 

1936 births
1996 deaths
Footballers from Coventry
Association football fullbacks
English footballers
Coventry City F.C. players
Walsall F.C. players
English Football League players